Bartle Bogle Hegarty (BBH) is a British global advertising agency. Founded in 1982 by British ad men John Bartle,  Nigel Bogle, and John Hegarty, BBH has offices in London, New York City, Singapore, Shanghai, Mumbai, Stockholm and Los Angeles and employs more than 1,000 staff worldwide.  The company is part of international agency group Publicis. In 2018 BBH was named the IPA Effectiveness Company of the Year.

History

The agency's first ad was for Levi's and it showed a black sheep going against the herd. It became the agency icon and spawned the phrase, "when the world zigs, zag". The Levi's black sheep poster was not an easy ad to buy because at the time all jeans ads had people in them, but it proved successful.

Over the next 28 years, BBH went on to produce many award-winning films for Levi's. "Launderette" featured Nick Kamen and was set to Marvin Gaye's recording of 'I Heard It Through the Grapevine'. Levi's sold over 2 million boxer shorts in one year. In 1991, BBH cast the then-unknown Brad Pitt in the Levi's commercial titled "Camera." Other classic work includes "Drugstore", "Creek", "Flatbeat" featuring Flat Eric – a small yellow puppet, "Clayman" and "Odyssey" which was directed by Jonathan Glazer. The 28-year relationship resulted in a total of seven number one singles in Europe.

In 1997, Leo Burnett Worldwide purchased a 49% share in BBH; that share was then held by the Publicis advertising group. In July 2012, a final 51% share in BBH previously attributed to the agency's co-founders was bought out by part-owners Publicis.

BBH has worked for global brands including British Airways, Johnnie Walker, and AXE.

BBH works with global brands including Audi, Google and Absolut.

In 2006, the agency launched ZAG, a branding and venturing division and in 2014 the agency created BBH Sport, bringing BBH brand strategy and creativity to the world of sport. BBH combines in-depth and specialist experience in areas beyond broadcast advertising including CRM, data, social, experience and brand design, to create growth for their clients.

In 2006, BBT's deputy chairman Guy Murphy left the company to join JWT as global planning director.

Labor disputes
On September 20, 2018, the American labor union SAG-AFTRA called a strike against Bartle Bogle Hegarty, and instructed its members not to accept work from the agency.

In early September, BBH announced that it had withdrawn from its SAG-AFTRA Commercials Contract, first entered into in 1999.

BBH had contended that the union's contractual terms, which do not permit the use of non-union actors and provide for compensation minimums and residuals, put the agency at a competitive disadvantage, stating that "Many of our peer agencies are not signatories."

SAG-AFTRA countered that it had added certain waivers for low-budget commercials, among other provisions, to its contract language, in response to concerns about profitability. The union also said that the strike was against BBH only, and not other subsidiaries of the Publicis Group, including Leo Burnett and Saatchi & Saatchi, who are themselves signatories of the contract at issue.

Awards
BBH has won the Queen's Award for Export twice.

John Hegarty was knighted in the 2007 Queen's Birthday Honours and Nigel Bogle was knighted in the 2013 list.

BBH has been Agency of the Year twice at the Cannes Lions International Advertising Festival, first awarded in 1993, and BBH founder Sir John Hegarty also won the first "Lion of St Mark" award.

BBH London was Campaign magazine's UK Agency of the Year in 1986, 1993, 2003, 2004, 2005, 2011 and 2012. and Creativity's "Innovators of the year" in 2014.

BBH also became Effectiveness Agency of the Year for 2008 at both the IPA and APG awards, the first agency to achieve this feat.

BBH was awarded the British Academy Film Award for Home in 2017.

BBH Singapore was awarded Ad Age's 2018 ‘International Agency of the Year’.

BBH was named Effectiveness Company of the Year at the 2018 IPA Effectiveness Awards, winning the Grand Prix for Audi alongside six other awards: a gold for Audi, three silvers for Barclays, Virgin Media and Weetabix and a bronze for IAG Cargo.

BBH has been named in the "Sunday Times 100 Best Companies to Work For", for the past 11 years and in 2019 received a three star accreditation rating.

References

Further reading

External links

Advertising agencies of the United Kingdom
Companies established in 1982
Publicis Groupe
1982 establishments in England